San Clemente High School is a Catholic high school in the Mayfield area of Newcastle, New South Wales, Australia.

History 
In the year 1916 a small girls' school was founded by the Dominican Order of nuns in Kerr Street, Mayfield. Three years later the property previously known as "Redcliff" was purchased. The school was moved to its current location in Havelock Street, and became a secondary school for young ladies, run by the sisters of St Dominic.

In the 62 years that followed the school became well known as both a boarding school and a day school with various extensions and modifications.

In 1977 the school became the first high school in the Diocese of Maitland-Newcastle to be run completely by lay staff, when the last Dominican sisters left, and the first lay principal was appointed.  At that time, the school had an enrolment of approximately 250 girls.

In 1983 the school became co-educational and the first boys were enrolled.

In 2009, the school held a very formal opening ceremony joined by guests such as Bishop Michael Malone and Sharon Grierson, to celebrate the official opening of the new multimillion-dollar developments.

References

External links 
San Clemente school website

Catholic secondary schools in New South Wales
Educational institutions established in 1916
1916 establishments in Australia
Newcastle, New South Wales